David Dower Leech (9 March 1927 – 21 October 2017) was a New Zealand hammer thrower and athletics official. He represented his country at the 1962 British Empire and Commonwealth Games. In 1997, he won a World Masters hammer throw title in the M70 category.

Early life and family
Leech was born on 9 March 1927. He married his wife, Patricia Elizabeth, in the 1950s.

Athletics

National competition
He went on to win the national title on four occasions in all, with successive victories in 1964 and 1965.

International competition
At the 1962 British Empire and Commonwealth Games in Perth, Leech represented New Zealand in the hammer throw.

Masters athletics
Leech went on to be active in Masters athletics. Between 1976 and 2014, he won 20 age-group titles in the hammer throw at New Zealand Masters championships, and he won a world Masters hammer throw bronze medal in the M70 category at the 1997 World Veterans Athletics Championships.

Management
At the 1974 British Commonwealth Games in Christchurch, Carr was a New Zealand's athletics section assistant manager, and two years later he was the athletics section manager for the New Zealand team at the 1976 Summer Olympics in Montreal. He received a merit award from Athletics New Zealand in 1988, and was awarded life membership of Athletics Canterbury in 1988.

Death
Leech died in Christchurch on 21 October 2017. His wife, Pat, died in 2021.

References

1927 births
2017 deaths
Athletes (track and field) at the 1962 British Empire and Commonwealth Games
Commonwealth Games competitors for New Zealand
New Zealand male hammer throwers
New Zealand sports executives and administrators
New Zealand masters athletes